Umutsuz Ev Kadınları, is a Turkish comedy-drama TV series, based on the American comedy-drama TV series Desperate Housewives.

Series overview

International broadcasts

Differences from the original series
 Andrew isn't gay.
 Katherine is not a lesbian and doesn't leave the street with Robin.
 Susan doesn't move out from Wisteria Lane in the 6th season.
 Eddie doesn't kill his mother or move in with Lynette.
 Julie doesn't become pregnant.
 Edie doesn't have a son.
 Mike isn't a plumber, he is an electric engineer.
 Bree never becomes an alcoholic.
 Orson doesn't hit Chuck with a car.
 Yasemin's house doesn't have a gas explosion in the 1st season, its windows are smashed.
 No plane falls onto the street.
 Bree's house doesn't get damaged from a tornado, it is damaged by a gas explosion. Sylvia blew up the kitchen to kill herself.
 Karen McCluskey's house doesn't get demolished by a tornado.
 Gabrielle is acted by two actresses, firstly (1-80) Evrim Solmaz, then (80-154) Deniz Uğur.
 There is not as much sexual content as in the original series.
 Karl doesn't die, but he doesn't appear after the 2nd season. In the rest of the seasons Karl is changed with Julie's uncle Ejder.
 Bree and Karl don't get together.
 Susan doesn't do cleaning in front of a webcam in lingerie.
 Edie doesn't die, Özge Özder continued to act as Renee Perry from 124th episode until final.
 Karl doesn't buy a house for Susan after hers burnt down, he rents one.
 Susan doesn't stay in a caravan after her house burnt down.
 Susan doesn't write a children's novels, she is a tailor.
 Susan and Karl don't have sex in the second season. Karl comes to Susan's house drunk and vomits so she has to take him into her house.
 Victor Lang doesn't die in the tornado, he's shot by Wayne.
 Carlos doesn't become blind from getting hit in the head with a flying object, he becomes blind from being shot in the head by Victor.
 Beth doesn't commit suicide with a gunshot, she cuts herself in Susan's bathroom.
 4362 Wisteria Lane, Edie and Renee's house, is replaced with three houses. In the first episode it was a first-floor, single-story apartment flat. After a fire it's replaced with another apartment flat in the street. In the third season it's replaced with a blue, two-story house.
 Mary Alice's house doesn't include a pool. The pool is replaced with a tree.
 There isn't a character for Ida Greenberg.
 Alejandro isn't Gabrielle's stepfather, he's her ex-husband who beat her during their marriage.
 Susan doesn't get locked out naked, she was in her bathrobe.
 Susan doesn't have a relationship with anyone when Mike is in a coma.

References 

Desperate Housewives
Turkish comedy television series
Turkish drama television series
Television series by Med Yapım
2011 Turkish television series debuts
2014 Turkish television series endings
Kanal D original programming
Fox (Turkish TV channel) original programming
Turkish television series based on American television series
Television shows set in Istanbul
Television series produced in Istanbul
Television series set in the 2010s